Lance Benoist (born August 26, 1988) is an American mixed martial artist. He currently fights for the Ultimate Fighting Championship in their welterweight division.

Mixed Martial Arts career

Early career
Benoist went undefeated in his amateur career and compiled a record of 14-0-1, finishing almost all of his opponents in the first round. He had his first professional fight on January 30, 2010 and won the bout via triangle choke submission.

Ultimate Fighting Championship
In June 2011, Benoist signed a multi-fight contract with the UFC. He faced Matthew Riddle in his Octagon debut.  He won the fight via unanimous decision in a bout that earned Fight of the Night honors.

Benoist next faced Seth Baczynski on June 8, 2012 at UFC on FX 3. He lost for the first time in his career via split decision.

Benoist faced Sean Pierson on September 22, 2012 at UFC 152, replacing Dan Miller. He lost the fight via unanimous decision.

Benoist was expected to face Paulo Thiago on May 18, 2013 at UFC on FX 8.  However, Benoist was forced out of the bout with a broken leg and was replaced by promotional newcomer Michel Prazeres.

Benoist faced Bobby Voelker on June 7, 2014 at UFC Fight Night 42. He won the back-and-forth fight via unanimous decision.

Championships and accomplishments
Ultimate Fighting Championship
Fight of the Night (One time) vs. Matthew Riddle

Mixed martial arts record

|-
| Win
|align=center| 7–2
| Bobby Voelker
| Decision (unanimous)
| UFC Fight Night: Henderson vs. Khabilov
| 
|align=center|3
|align=center|5:00
| Albuquerque, New Mexico, United States
|
|-
| Loss
|align=center| 6–2
| Sean Pierson
| Decision (unanimous)
| UFC 152
| 
|align=center|3
|align=center|5:00
| Toronto, Ontario, Canada
|
|-
| Loss
|align=center| 6–1
| Seth Baczynski
| Decision (split)
| UFC on FX: Johnson vs. McCall
| 
|align=center| 3
|align=center| 5:00
| Sunrise, Florida, United States
| 
|-
| Win
|align=center| 6–0
| Matthew Riddle
| Decision (unanimous)
| UFC Fight Night: Shields vs. Ellenberger 
| 
|align=center| 3
|align=center| 5:00
| New Orleans, Louisiana, United States
| 
|-
| Win
|align=center| 5–0
| Ryne Vincent
| Submission (triangle choke)
| CCCW: Fight Night 3
| 
|align=center| 1
|align=center| 2:56
| St. Louis, Missouri, United States
| 
|-
| Win
|align=center| 4–0
| Dustin Baker
| Submission (rear-naked choke)
| PCL: Cage Madness
| 
|align=center| 1
|align=center| 4:36
| Glen Carbon, Illinois, United States
| 
|-
| Win
|align=center| 3–0
| Miguel Rios
| Submission (guillotine choke)
| MCC 30: Thanksgiving Throwdown
| 
|align=center| 1
|align=center| 0:57
| Des Moines, Iowa, United States
| 
|-
| Win
|align=center| 2–0
| Cleburn Walker
| KO (head kick)
| Fight Me MMA 1: The Battle Begins
| 
|align=center| 1
|align=center| 4:34
| St. Charles, Missouri, United States
| 
|-
| Win
|align=center| 1–0
| Jamell Austin
| Submission (triangle choke)
| Devastation Fight Club
| 
|align=center| 1
|align=center| 0:53
| Cape Girardeau, Missouri, United States
| 
|-

Personal life
Lance's identical twin brother, Logan Benoist, was killed in a tragic vehicle accident on Monday, April 23, 2012. Logan was a U.S. Marine and an Iraq War combat veteran.
Lance attended Festus high school. Benoist also has a sister.

See also
 List of male mixed martial artists

References

External links
 Official UFC Profile
 
 
 MMA Record
 Cage Championships Title History

Living people
American male mixed martial artists
Mixed martial artists utilizing Brazilian jiu-jitsu
1988 births
Ultimate Fighting Championship male fighters
American practitioners of Brazilian jiu-jitsu